Pathibhara Yangwarak  is a rural municipality (Gaunpalika) in Taplejung District of Province No. 1 of Nepal. Formerly the rural municipality was  divided into many village development committees) located in Taplejung District in the Mechi Zone of EDR of Nepal. The local body came in existence when those VDCs: Nyangkholchyang, Thechambu, Tiringe, Dumrise, Chaksibot and Thumbedin merged after decision of MoFALD. Currently, it has a total of 6 wards. The population of the rural municipality is 13,591 according to the data collected on 2017 Nepalese local elections.

Population 
As per 2017, Yangabarak hosts a population of 13,591 across a total area of 93.76 km2.

See also
Taplejung District

References

Rural municipalities in Taplejung District
Rural municipalities in Koshi Province
Rural municipalities of Nepal established in 2017